Lindenow is a closed station located in the town of Lindenow South, on the Bairnsdale railway line railway line in Victoria, Australia. The station was one of 35 closed to passenger traffic on 4 October 1981 as part of the New Deal timetable for country passengers. A disused passenger platform was located at the station but was removed in mid 2015, while the goods siding and cattle yards had been removed in the early 1980s. Can no longer be considered a station at all.

References

Disused railway stations in Victoria (Australia)
Transport in Gippsland (region)
Shire of East Gippsland